Targowisko  is a village in the administrative district of Gmina Kłaj, within Wieliczka County, Lesser Poland Voivodeship, in southern Poland.

The village has a population of 1,670.

References

Targowisko